The Internet Service Providers Association of New Zealand (ISPANZ) is an organisation formed by Internet service providers (ISPs) in New Zealand. Its members include most New Zealand ISPs with the exceptions of Spark, Telstra and Vodafone.

Its objectives are:
To promote and facilitate the effective functioning of the Internet in NZ as an open system.
To promote wide connectivity and diverse styles of delivery for the Internet.
To promote a fully competitive market place for Internet services.
To inform concerning the possibilities for advancement of Internet services in NZ, and contribute to the wide understanding of the techniques and economics used in providing telecommunications infrastructure for the Internet.
To encourage diversity, innovation, cooperation and independence for Internet Service Providers, resellers and Internet users in NZ.

Board
ISPANZ is led by a board of directors.

As of December 2021, the board consists of:

 Mark Frater - Director, President
 Shaun Fisher - Director, Vice-President
 Mike Stevenson - Director, Secretary
 Steve Ritchie - Director, Treasurer
 Seeby Woodhouse - Director
 Bruce Trevarthen - Director

 David Haynes - CEO

Members
The current members as of December 2021 are below. A current member list is maintained on the ISPANZ website.

Actrix Networks Limited
Enhanced Solutions
Compass Communications Ltd
DTS
ICONZ
InSPire Net Limited
Rexnetworks
Netspace
NZRS
New Zealand Technology Group
Primo
TrustPower
Velocity
Woosh
Gravity Internet Ltd
Kordia
Media tribe
Ufone
Vetta Online
Velocity Internet
Vital
Voyager Internet
Wheronet
Wizwireless
Prodigi Technology Services Ltd 
Ezyconnecy Rural Broadband

See also
Broadband Internet access (New Zealand)

References

External links
 

Internet service providers of New Zealand